Near East Art Museum is a museum of art located in Yerevan, Armenia. The museum was opened in 1993 and is based on a collection donated by Marcos Grigorian, painter, collector and honorary citizen of Yerevan in the memory of his daughter, actress Sabrina Grigorian, The museum shares the building with Yerevan Museum of Literature and Culture.

The Museum houses about 2,600 exhibits containing works of Marcos Grigorian as well as Russian, European and Middle Eastern applied arts - Iranian faucets of the 12th-19th centuries, doorknockers, keys, locks, nails, Iranian-Turkmen silver ornaments of the 18th-19th centuries, 3 or 4,000-year-old bronze items, etc. The exhibits are housed in 3 hall rooms.

Notes
 Earth Works. Grigorian, 1988, New York.
 The Contemporary Armenian Carpet, Near East Museum, Yerevan, 1999.

References

External links
  Marcos Grigorian's works at the center of "Middle East Art Museum" exhibition
 After reconstruction, the museum opened its doors to the renewed Middle East exhibition

Museums in Yerevan
History museums
Art museums established in 1993
1993 establishments in Armenia